Downs is a hamlet in the Vale of Glamorgan near the county border with the City of Cardiff. It lies just off the A48 road along a road called Grant's Field, just west of Culverhouse Cross and just south of the historical estate of Coedarhydyglyn. The village of St. Nicholas, Vale of Glamorgan lies to the west. The Traherne Arms lies along the main road near the village and, being near the top of The Tumble hill above Culverhouse Cross, has panoramic views of the Welsh capital of Cardiff.

References

Villages in the Vale of Glamorgan